Paul Terrio (born May 4, 1943) is a Canadian prelate of the Roman Catholic Church. He currently serves as bishop of the Diocese of Saint Paul, Alberta.

Biography
Terrio was born in Montreal. He was ordained a priest on May 23, 1970. He was appointed as bishop of St. Paul by Pope Benedict XVI on October 18, 2012. He received his episcopal consecration on December 12, 2012.  On January 1, 2021 it was announced that he was retiring and anticipated a replacement bishop in 2021.

References

External links

1943 births
Living people
21st-century Roman Catholic bishops in Canada
Roman Catholic bishops of Saint Paul, Alberta